Lisbeth Bech-Nielsen (née Lisbeth Bech Poulsen; born 1 December 1982 in Sønderborg) is a Danish politician, who is a member of the Folketing for the Socialist People's Party. She was elected into the Folketing in the 2011 Danish general election.

Political career
Bech-Nielsen first entered the Folketing after the 2011 election, receiving 1,334 votes. She was reelected with 1,652 votes in 2015. In both elections her seat was a levelling seat. In the 2019 election she received 2,645 votes, which was enough for a district seat.

External links 
 Biography on the website of the Danish Parliament (Folketinget)

References 

Living people
1982 births
People from Sønderborg Municipality
21st-century Danish women politicians
Women members of the Folketing
Socialist People's Party (Denmark) politicians
Members of the Folketing 2011–2015
Members of the Folketing 2015–2019
Members of the Folketing 2019–2022
20th-century Danish women
Members of the Folketing 2022–2026